Karl O'Lynch von Town, or Carl O'Lynch of Town (22 June 1869 in Ljubljana – 31 January 1942 in Genoa) was an Austrian Post-Impressionist painter of Irish ancestry.

Biography 
His family was one of the "Tribes of Galway" and were among the original sponsors of St. Nicholas' Collegiate Church. In the 1690s his ancestor, James O'Lynch, emigrated to the Austro-Hungarian Empire, following the defeat of the Jacobites. Karl's father was a mathematician, specializing in geometry.

From 1888  to 1890, he attended the drawing school in Graz, then studied at the Academy of Fine Arts, Vienna, with Siegmund L'Allemand. Later, he continued his studies at the Academy of Fine Arts, Munich, with Gabriel von Hackl and Nikolaus Gysis. In 1904, he had his first major showing at the fifth annual exhibition of the Artists' Association of  Styria.

Although he exhibited frequently in Graz and Vienna, he established his studio in Munich, where he became involved in the circle of artists associated with Emil Jakob Schindler. He was a member of the Hagenbund from 1904 to 1906.

A frequent traveler, he visited Italy, the Netherlands, Belgium and England. Among his favorite subjects were coastal landscapes around the North Sea. However, after staying at the art colony in Dachau, he became fascinated with the mountains and spent much of his remaining career painting in Upper Bavaria, the Austrian Alps and the Dolomites.

His painting of Vernazza was bought by Adolf Hitler at the Große Deutsche Kunstausstellung of 1938 for 1,500 Reichsmarks. He died during a visit to Italy and is interred in Graz. A major retrospective was held there in 1949.

Selected paintings

References

External links 

ArtNet: More works by O'Lynch.

1869 births
1942 deaths
19th-century Austrian painters
19th-century German male artists
20th-century Austrian painters
20th-century male artists
Austrian landscape painters
Academy of Fine Arts Vienna alumni
Austrian people of Irish descent
Artists from Ljubljana
Slovenian people of Irish descent
Artists from Munich